The Warracknabeal Herald is a newspaper published in Warracknabeal, Victoria, Australia.

History 
The Warracknabeal Herald has been published under that title since 1902. It had previously been published as:
 Northern Argus
 Warracknabeal herald and Wimmera district advocate

References

Newspapers published in Victoria (Australia)
Wimmera
1902 establishments in Australia
Warracknabeal